Benjamin Franklin Roller (July 1, 1876 – April 19, 1933) was an American physician, a professional wrestler and a football player.

Biography

Early life
Roller was born in Newman, Illinois. where he grew up on his family's farm. As a boy on the farm, Roller dreamed of becoming a doctor. His mother encouraged him to attend college, while his father felt that every man should make his own way, picking up his education by experience.

He attended college at De Pauw University, after his mother, a former school teacher, helped him prepare for the entrance examination. Due to the family's lack of money, Ben worked at a dry goods store, pulling nails for 15 cents an hour. He used the money to buy new clothes for attending school. Upon arriving at De Pauw, Roller started a gym class, that began his athletic career in football and wrestling. He was the runt in his family of six, at 6'0 and 200 pounds. He soon became the captain of the school's football and track teams.

Upon graduation from De Pauw, Roller attended the University of Pennsylvania. With a lack of money for college, he soon began to play football at the professional ranks.

Professional football career
He played pro football for the Pittsburgh Athletic Club, Duquesne Country and Athletic Club, Philadelphia Athletic Club  and was later a player-coach with the Philadelphia Phillies of the first National Football League. In December 1902, he played for the "New York" team during the World Series of Football. In 1903, he played with the Franklin Athletic Club and won his return trip to the World Series of Football with that team. He began the 1903 season with Syracuse Athletic Club.

He also played on several of the Penn college teams and won the "university championship" in his second and fourth years, however he never played for the varsity because of a four-year rule.

Post-college
After graduating from Penn, Roller assisted Dr. Barton Cooke, a professor at the medical school, in writing a textbook. He decided to accept a position as professor of physiology at the University of Washington. He also served as the supervisor to the school's athletics and as an advisor to the Seattle Athletic Club. After two years with the school, he decided to open an office. He also worked as a land speculator and acquired wealth up until the Panic of 1907.

Wrestling career

He later resigned that position in 1906 to become a full-time wrestler. Roller’s first professional match was against Jack Carkeek. Roller won two falls in a period of 17 minutes and received $1,600. After that, he started having matches around the Northwest, under the names Dr. Roller, Dr. Benjamin Roller, Dr. B.F. Roller, and Doc Roller. He next wrestled Frank Gotch in an exhibition match, for which he received $4,000. After the bout with Gotch, Roller decided to use wrestling as tool for traveling the world and studying under the noted professors in both the United States and Europe. Over the span of his career, Roller defeated many of the top wrestlers of his day. These wrestlers included Farmer Burns, Fred Beell, Ed Lewis, and Joe Stecher, who was managed by Gotch. From 1906–1918, Roller posted a record of 39 wins, 26 losses, and 4 draws in 69 matches.

Death

Roller died of pneumonia on April 19, 1933, at the age of 56.

Championships and accomplishments
 Professional wrestling
 American Heavyweight Championship (3 times)

References

1876 births
1933 deaths
Players of American football from Illinois
DePauw University alumni
American catch wrestlers
American male professional wrestlers
Philadelphia Athletic Club players
Pittsburgh Athletic Club (football) players
Philadelphia Phillies (NFL) players
People associated with physical culture
Franklin Athletic Club players
New York (World Series of Football) players
Syracuse Athletic Association players
19th-century players of American football
20th-century professional wrestlers
Duquesne Country and Athletic Club players